The Warthin–Starry stain (WS) is a silver nitrate-based staining method (a silver stain) used in histology. It was first introduced in 1920 by American pathologists Aldred Scott Warthin (1866-1931) and Allen Chronister Starry (1890-1973), for the detection of spirochetes. It has been considered a standard stain for the detection of spirochetes, and is also used to stain Helicobacter pylori, Lawsonia intracellularis, Microsporidia, and particulates. It is also important for confirmation of Bartonella henselae, a causative organism in cat-scratch disease.

Warthin–Starry stains organisms dark brown to black, and the background light golden brown/golden yellow.

See also
Dieterle stain

References

External links

Staining